A la Ciudad de Londres was a traditional European store, which operated Buenos Aires from 1872 to 1922. It was the first large clothing store established in the city of Buenos Aires towards the end of the 19th century.

History 

This fashion store was installed in Buenos Aires by 1870. Its owner was Jean Brun, of French origin, who opened the first branch in the neighborhood of 
Monserrat. It was inaugurated on March 15, 1873 at the intersections of Peru and Avenida de Mayo streets.

On October 10, 1910, after a fire that destroyed the original store, a second branch was opened located on the streets Pellegrini and Corrientes, in the neighborhood of San Nicolas. The original store building located in Peru and Mayo streets was destroyed in a fire on August 19, 1910.

The employees of this store founded the Club Atlético Independiente in 1904.

A la Ciudad de Londres traded with the main European houses, including fashion products of England, Scotland and France. It was the main store in Buenos Aires towards end of the 19th century, and early 20th century.

Gallery

References

External links 
Un recorrido por el pasado a través de las grandes tiendas LA NACION

Buildings and structures in Buenos Aires
Shopping malls in Buenos Aires